Nadjim Haroun (born 10 June 1988) is a Chadian footballer who plays for Bierbeek HO in Belgium and the Chad national team. He is the younger brother of Faris Haroun, a footballer playing in Royal Antwerp.

Personal life
Nadjim was born in Jette, Belgium, to a Chadian father and a Belgian mother. He holds a Chadian passport. Nadjim is the brother of Faris Haroun who represented the Belgium national team, and the cousin of Kévin Nicaise who represents the Chad national team.

See also
 List of Chad international footballers

References

External links
 
 

1988 births
Living people
Chadian footballers
Chad international footballers
Belgian footballers
Belgian people of Chadian descent
Black Belgian sportspeople
People from Jette
Association football midfielders
Footballers from Brussels